The 2012–13 season was Anorthosis' 64th consecutive season in the Cypriot First Division, the top division of Cyprus football. It covers a period from 1 July 2011 to 30 May 2012.

Anorthosis Famagusta began the season in Second qualifying round of Europa League. Anorthosis faced the cup winner of Estonian for the season 2011–12, Levadia Tallinn, On the first match Anorthosis Famagusta defeat the Estonian club 3-1 (Spadacio, Toni Calvo, Ricardo Laborde) in Kadrioru Stadium, with MVP the best player of the club Ricardo Laborde. On 26 July in Antonis Papadopoulos Stadium Anorthosis defeat Levadia Tallinn with score 3–0 with scorers (Okkas, Toni Calvo, Ricardo Laborde), with MVP the attacking midfielder of the team Juliano Spadacio. On 28 August, Anorthosis defeat Georgian Dila Gori away with score 0–1, With scorer Giannis Okkas at 69th minute. Dila Gori played with 10 players after the ban of Gogita Gogua with red card from the referee. On 9 August after a bad match anorthosis end their European dream at 3rd QR. of uefa europa league. Anorthosis lost 3–0 at his home from Dila Gori.

Season overview

Pre-season
Anorthosis Famagusta commenced their summer transfer activity on 19 March, signing Cypriot Goalkeeper Christos Mastrou for 3 seasons from Anagennisi Dherynia on a free transfer. On 7 May, Anorthosis has renewed its collaboration with Ricardo Laborde up in 2017 by buying rights from Atlético Huila. This transcription cost 300,000 dollars. On 12 May Anorthosis Famagusta at the end of the football season 2011–12 announced the termination of contracts and failure to renew its cooperation with the players association Matúš Kozáčik, Adam Stachowiak, Janício Martins, Stanislav Angelov, Michalis Konstantinou, and Jaouad Zairi. Additionally, Dato Kvirkvelia has also been added to those departing from the team. The player expressed the wish to leave the team for personal reasons. The best centre back of Champions League 2012 Paulo Jorge was signed for 2 seasons on a free transfer from Apoel Nicosia on 13 May. On 13 May, Anorthosis has renewed its collaboration with Jan Rezek up in 2015 by buying rights from Viktoria Plzeň. This transcription cost 220,000 Euros. On 26 May, Anorthosis Demetris Economou was signed for 5 seasons on a transfer from Enosis Neon Paralimni. This transcription cost 100,000 Euros. On 28 May, Anorthosis Announce the terminations of the contract with Igor Tomašić by paying compensation to the player €90,000. On 29 May, Anorthosis Announce the contract with the national player with Montenegro team Srđan Blažić for the next two years. On 30 May, Anorthosis Announce the contract with the 25 years old Toni Calvo until 2014. On 4 June was Anorthosis first unofficial training into Andonis Papadopoulos stadium. Anothosis began the training with the part of the current squad, Marco Andic, Paulo Jorge, Jurgen Colin, Christos Marangos, Vincent Laban, Valentinos Sielis, Christos Mastrou, Gabriel Constantinou, Demetris Economou, Zacharias Theodorou, Adamos Andreou, Constantinos Laifis, Civard Sprockel, Savvas Panayiotou and Panayiotis Loizides. On 6 June, Anorthosis Announce the contract with the 32 years old William Boaventura. On 9 June, Anorthosis Announce the contract with Giorgos Sielis the brother of the international player of Anorthosis Famagusta Valentinos Sielis. On 16 June, Anorthosis Announce the contract with the Brazilian Midfielder Juliano Spadacio for 1+1 years contract. On 21 June, Anorthosis announced a two-year contract with the National Slovenian Right back Branko Ilič. On 27 June, Anorthosis Announce the contract for 1+1 years with the national Romania Midfielder, Dan Alexa. Victorious team began the cycle of friendly games in preparation in Austria. The team with two goals from Spadacio and one of Roncatto and Laborde, won the FC Wacker Innsbruck II with 4–0. Tie ended 1–1 in the second friendly of the team in preparation of Austria, against Dinamo București. Not completed the third friendly of the team, with Dinamo Kiev, and the pitch was unsuitable due to heavy rain and 55 was stopped finally and while the team was ahead in the score to 3–1. The team's fourth friendly match in Austria was completed with a draw, without goals, against Petrolul Ploiesti. The game's greatest lost chance was on 55', when in a penalty won by the team Giannis Okkas aimed the goal post. On 12 July, Anorthosis won Doxa katokopias for the last friendly match before European competitions with 2–1.

Club

Coaching staff

Club hierarchy

Current squad
Last Update: 12 January 2013

Reserve squad

Out on loan

Foreign players

Active Internationals

Transfers

In

 

 
 
 

 
 

 

 

Total expenditure:  €550.180

Out

Total income:  €250.000

Friendly matches

Goal Scorers

UEFA Europa League

Goal Scorers

Cypriot First Division

Goal Scorers

Results by round

Classification

Play-offs table
The first 12 teams are divided into 3 groups. Points are carried over from the regular season.

Group A

Cypriot Cup

Goal Scorers

Squad statistics

Disciplinary record

|-
! colspan="2" | Players !! 16 !! Card totals 
!39!!3!!2!!7!!0!!1!!0!!0!!0!!0!!0!!0!!40!!1!!2!!

 4  one match ban
 6  one match ban
 8  one match ban
 10  one match ban
 12+  one match ban per card
 1+1  one match ban –  1–4 match ban

Bans

Barak Yitzhaki (3 Match BAN from the championship 3–5 match day)
Vincent Laban (3 Match BAN from European competitions)

Top 5 players rankings

Goals - Assist
Championship = 1.5 Points
Europa League = 1.5 Points
Cypriot Cup = 1 Points
Times MVP = 1*Times

Most Valuable Players

Last updated: 2 April 2012
Source:

References

External links
 

Anorthosis Famagusta F.C. seasons
Anorthosis Famagusta